Newport High School may refer to:

 Newport High School (Arkansas)
 Newport High School (Kentucky)
 Newport High School (New Hampshire)
 Newport High School (Oregon)
 Newport High School (Pennsylvania)
 Newport High School (Bellevue, Washington)
 Newport High School (Newport, South Wales)
 Newport High School (Newport, Washington)
 Newport Central Catholic High School, Newport, Kentucky
 Newport Harbor High School, Newport Beach, California
 Newport Girls High School, a girls' grammar school in Newport, Shropshire, England